Nighthawk Custom is an American firearm company based in Berryville, Arkansas, US, that manufactures custom M1911 pistols, rifles, revolvers, shotguns, and tactical knives for competition shooters, military, law enforcement and self-defense.

History
Nighthawk was formed in 2004 when some of the gunsmiths who worked for Wilson Combat left to focus exclusively on custom pistols. Both companies are located in Berryville. Mark Stone is a founder and the owner of Nighthawk Custom. Nighthawk has been praised highly for its quality and customer service. Nighthawk strives daily to supply the Nighthawk difference, no matter the task. 

Over the years, Nighthawk gunsmiths have used their skills to grow from only building 1911 pistols to now also making custom shotguns, knives, and an improved version of the Browning Hi-Power. Nighthawk also has a fully functioning machine shop that produces the parts, which are used to build their high-end firearms.

Nighthawk Custom
Nighthawk Custom specializes in offering reliable and accurate pistols made for all varieties of shooting. The range includes the Talon, Dominator, AAC, and Predator lines. The Talon has three varieties, the Talon 5", Talon II and the Talon II with Bobtail. All pistols in the Custom range are fully customizable from finishes to sights to grip design. The pistols are finished using a Nitride coating due to its durability and they range in price from $3000 to $7000.

Richard Heinie models
Richard Heinie, a respected figure in the M1911 community, had requested Nighthawk to build a range of his renowned pistols under his supervision. This partnership arose when Heinie witnessed some of Nighthawk's pistols at a shooting event and was impressed with the quality and workmanship. The Heinie range comprises the Lady Hawk, PDP and Tactical Carry. These are not as customizable as the normal Custom range; however, they are still made to the same high standard. The Lady Hawk is aimed at females and has a thinner grip and fire the less powerful 9×19 mm round instead of the standard .45 ACP.

Nighthawk Tactical
The Tactical branch of Nighthawk specializes in military and home defense products rather than collectible or competition pistols. The range covers a small selection of pistols and their Overseer line of tactical shotguns.

The GRP or Global Response Pistol is the main pistol in the Tactical product offering. It is a base model that offers the accuracy and reliability of the highest-end Nighthawk pistol, but does not include some of the additional high-end upgrades that are available from Nighthawk. Nighthawk states that their Enforcer pistol is considered to be "Nighthawk's flagship in their tactical line of handguns." This handgun has been designed and built to address several weak points in the M1911 handgun. Its unique 'features' include a plunger tube that is integral to the handgun frame, a magazine-well that is also integral, and a slide stop that has been cut flush with the frame. The other top seller in the Tactical pistol line is the Shadowhawk. Resulting from a collaboration with Steve Fisher, the Shadowhawk has many upgrades that will satisfy any customer looking for the best tactical 1911 on the market.

Tactical rifle
For a limited time, Nighthawk built custom precision rifles. Because Nighthawk was one of the sponsors for the annual International Sniper Competition at Fort Benning, Georgia, they built a precision rifle. Nighthawk took inspiration from the rifles present at the Competition to offer a precision rifle to their customers. Nighthawk took these rifles one step further and created their tactical rifle range. With the option of either bolt-on or integral Picatinny rail, the rifles were able to be customized with scopes and different finishes. The finish was Perma Kote. The rifle were able to be finished in camouflage or a customized color scheme. The rifles were able to be chambered in a variety of calibers ranging from .222 Remington to .338 Lapua Magnum.

Tactical shotgun
Nighthawk offers customizable shotgun services including a massive range of add-on products and peripherals which are external and internal. The gun is built from a stock Remington 870.

The finish is Perma Kote and a range of sights are available, whether added to the frame such as the Fiber Optic front sight to the Picatinny rail Aimpoint Comp M4, a sight more regularly is seen on the M4 Carbine and M16A4 assault rifles. The shotgun is available with M4-inspired five-position crane stock or a more conventional Hogue buttstock with an in-frame pistol grip. Tactical lights, shell holders, recoil buffers and sling attachment swivels are  available.

Knives
Nighthawk Tactical makes a range of tactical military knives. There are four models: Model 510, Model 525, Model 530 and Model 550. They are very similar in material but vary in finish and blade length with the longest being 7" in the Model 550 and the shortest being the 3" Model 525 blade.

References 

Firearm manufacturers of the United States
Privately held companies based in Arkansas